The Little Rapid River is a  stream in Kalkaska County, Michigan, in the United States.  It is a tributary of the Rapid River, part of the Elk River Chain of Lakes Watershed flowing to Lake Michigan.

See also
List of rivers of Michigan

References

Michigan  Streamflow Data from the USGS

Rivers of Michigan
Rivers of Kalkaska County, Michigan
Tributaries of Lake Michigan